Ian David Bone (born 28 August 1947 in Mere, Wiltshire) is an English anarchist and publisher of anarchist newspapers and tabloids, such as Class War and The Bristolian. He has been involved in social campaigns since the 1960s, including the 2001 "Vote Nobody" election campaign.

In 1984, British tabloid newspaper The Sunday People described Bone as "The Most Dangerous Man in Britain".

Activities
Ian Bone is the son of a butler, and has said that this background greatly contributed to his later political outlook. He studied politics at Swansea University, becoming an active anarchist throughout the 1960s to early 1990s. He set up the anarchist agit-mag Alarm in Swansea. In the 1980s, with others, he set up the anarchist paper Class War. The confrontational style of the paper led to Bone becoming an infamous figure in the politics of the 1980s.

Based in London for most of the 1980s, he moved to Bristol in the early 1990s, where he became involved in various campaigns, but often keeping a low profile. Bone left the Class War federation in 1992, citing "too much dead wood" as the reason for his departure. Along with other members who left with him, Bone set up the rival Class War Organisation, a venture which lasted less than six months.

In October 1994, Bone organised the Anarchy in the UK festival. Billed as "10 days that shook the world" and described in the festival programme as an attempt to host the largest gathering of international anarchists, the festival attempted to bring together different strands of the anarchist movement. Amongst events featured were an attempt to levitate parliament, an anarchist picnic, punk gigs and meetings about various aspects of anarchism. The festival was criticised by some anarchist groups (including Class War) for being too focused on lifestyle politics and only featuring a small amount of class struggle-based events.

In 2001 Bone started the Vote Nobody campaign which encouraged residents in Easton, Bristol to turn out for the local election and vote for 'Nobody'. In that same year he started The Bristolian, a scandal sheet that gave "independent news from Bristol that the other papers won't touch". Distributed for free in bars and pubs of Bristol, and by Bone himself in Bristol's Corn Street, the news-sheet gained a weekly circulation of over 15,000. He wrote much of the paper himself, but was assisted by local journalist Roy Norris and by his long-term partner Jane Nicholl. The success of The Bristolian led to the Bristolian Party, which stood in the 2003 Bristol City Council elections in an attempt to mobilise discontent with Bristol City Council's policies. Bone was criticised by some in the anarchist community for his involvement with this campaign. On 1 May 2003, 2,560 people voted for the Bristolian Party, which gained an 8% share of the vote in the 12 wards they contested. The Bristolian was runner-up for the Paul Foot Award for investigative journalism in 2005. It ceased publication shortly afterwards but has since returned in the same format with occasional double-page issues.

On 6 December 2006, Bone appeared on Channel 4's current affairs discussion show Starkey's Last Word, alongside Ed Vaizey and Harriet Harman, discussing the Iraq War. In it, Bone contended that the solution to the failing war was that British soldiers serving in Iraq should take part in mass desertion, that 10 Downing Street should be blockaded on May Day (International Workers' Day), and that the two speakers beside him, both of whom were pre-war advocates of the Iraq invasion, should be put on trial for war crimes.

Tangent Books published Bone's autobiography, Bash the Rich, in 2006. He sold its film rights to cult British film maker Greg Hall for £10 in 2007. A blog was created to follow the film from its conception to release. To promote the book, Bone organised a "Bash the Rich" march through Notting Hill, claiming he would march on David Cameron's house.

Bone said that Class War was standing candidates at the 2015 United Kingdom general election "because all other candidates are scum".

In September 2018, Russia Today broadcast footage of Bone doorstepping Conservative MP Jacob Rees-Mogg, shouting “Your daddy is a very horrible person" and "lots of people hate your daddy" at his young children. Bone's targeting of Rees-Mogg's children was widely condemned.

In May 2021, Bone unsuccessfully stood for election in a council by-election in Croydon.

Works

Anarchy in the UK podcast episodes

References

External links
 The Ian Bone Blog

1947 births
English anarchists
Living people
Politicians from Bristol
Alumni of Swansea University
People from Mere, Wiltshire